This is a list of listed buildings in Aberdeen. The list is split out by parish.

 List of listed buildings in Aberdeen/1
 List of listed buildings in Aberdeen/2
 List of listed buildings in Aberdeen/3
 List of listed buildings in Aberdeen/4
 List of listed buildings in Aberdeen/5
 List of listed buildings in Aberdeen/6
 List of listed buildings in Aberdeen/7
 List of listed buildings in Dyce, Aberdeen
 List of listed buildings in Newhills, Aberdeen
 List of listed buildings in Nigg, Aberdeen
 List of listed buildings in Old Machar, Aberdeen
 List of listed buildings in Peterculter, Aberdeen

Aberdeen